Euepicrius is a genus of mites in the family Ologamasidae.

Species
 Euepicrius bipeltatus Karg, 1997
 Euepicrius brevicruris Karg, 1993
 Euepicrius caesariatus (Lee & Hunter, 1974)
 Euepicrius femuralis Karg, 1993
 Euepicrius filamentosus Womersley, 1942
 Euepicrius lootsi Lee, 1970
 Euepicrius multipori Karg, 1993
 Euepicrius queenslandicus Womersley, 1956

References

Ologamasidae